August Friedrich Thienemann (7 September 1882 in Gotha – 22 April 1960 in Plön) was a German limnologist, zoologist and ecologist. He studied zoology at the University of Greifswald.

He was an associate Professor of Hydrobiology at the University of Kiel, and director of the former Hydrobiologische Anstalt der Kaiser-Wilhelm-Gesellschaft (now the Max-Planck-Institut für Limnologie) at Plön.

A co-founder of Societas Internationalis Limnologiae, Thienemann is best known for his work on the biology of the Chironomidae, and his contributions to the field of lake typology. He also introduced the concept of trophic level terminology in 1920. Over the course of his career, Thienemann published 460 works. One of his more noted students was Carmel Humphries, an Irish expert in Chironomidae.

Publications (partial list)
1909 B. Farwick, F. Schröder, A. Thienemann: "Bericht über die botanischen und zoologischen Exkursionen nach dem Weißenstein bei Hohenlimburg und nach der Glörtalsperre am 25. und 26. September 1909." S.-B. naturhist. Ver. preuß. Rheinl. Westf., E 1909: 94–101.
1910 "Die Stufenfolge der Dinge: Der Versuch eines natürlichen Systems der Naturkörper aus dem 18. Jahrhundert." Zoologische Annalen Würzburg 3, 185–274.
1911 "Hydrobiologische und fischereiliche Untersuchungen an westfälischen Talsperren." Z. wiss. Landwirtsch., 41: 535–716. Steglitz. 371.
1911 "Die Verschmutzung der Ruhr im Sommer 1911", in: Zeitschrift für Fischerei und deren Hilfswissenschaften 16 (1912), S. 55–86.
1912 "Der Bergbach des Sauerlandes. Faunistisch-biolozische Untersuchungen." Int. Rev. Ges. Hydrobiol. Biol./ Suppl. 4: 1–125. Leipzig.
1915 Die Chironomidenfauna der Eifelmaare; Verhandlungen des Naturhistorischen Vereins der preußischen Rheinlande und Westfalens 71
1918 Untersuchungen über de Beziehung zwischen dem Sauerstoffgehalt des Wassers und der Zusammensetzung der Fauna in norddeutschen Seen"; Arch. Hydrobiol. 12, 1 - 65.
1923 "Geschichte der 'Chironomus'-Forschung von Aristoteles bis zur Gegenwart." Deutsche Entomologische Zeitung, 515– 540.
1925 Die Binnengewässer Mitteleuropas; Stuttgart
1927 "Forschungsreisen und das System der Biologie." Zoologische Anzeiger 73, 245–253.
1928 Der Sauerstoff im eutrophen und oligotrophen See; Die Binnengewässer 4, Stuttgart
1931 Der Produktionsbegriff in der Biologie; Arch. Hydrobiol. 22, 616–622.
1939 Grundzüge einer allgemeinen Ökologie; ebda 35
1941 Leben und Umwelt; Leipzig
1951 "Vom Gebrauch und vom Mißbrauch der Gewässer in einem Kulturlande." Arch. Hydrobiol. 45, 557–583.
1954 "Lebenseinheiten." Abhandlungen des naturwissenschaftlichen Vereins Bremen 33, 303–326.
1955 Die Binnengewässer: Eine Einführung in die theoretische und angewandte Limnologie; Verständliche Wissenschaft 55, Berlin, Heidelberg und Jena.
1956 Leben und Umwelt: Vom Gesamthaushalt der Natur; Hamburg
1956 Die Binnengewässer; Stuttgart
1959 Erinnerungen und Tagebuchblätter eines Biologen; Ein Leben im Dienste der Limnologie; Stuttgart

References

German ecologists
20th-century  German zoologists
German limnologists
1882 births
1960 deaths
Academic staff of the University of Münster
People from Gotha (town)
People from Saxe-Gotha
Members of the Royal Swedish Academy of Sciences
Max Planck Institute directors
Academic staff of the University of Kiel
University of Greifswald alumni